The 1951–52 Irish Cup was the 72nd edition of the premier knock-out cup competition in Northern Irish football. 

Ards won the cup for the 2nd time, defeating the holders Glentoran 1–0 in the final at Windsor Park.

Results

First round

|}

Replay

|}

Second replay

|}

Quarter-finals

|}

Replay

|}

Second replay

|}

Semi-finals

|}

Replay

|}

Second replay

|}

Third replay

|}

Final

References

External links
The Rec.Sport.Soccer Statistics Foundation - Northern Ireland - Cup Finals

Irish Cup seasons
1951–52 in Northern Ireland association football
1951–52 domestic association football cups